All That We Make is a Canadian documentary film, directed by Annie St-Pierre and released in 2013. The film profiles four women associated with the Cercles de fermières du Québec, a provincewide network of local organizations for women involved in farming.

The film premiered as the closing gala at the 2013 Rencontres internationales du documentaire de Montréal.

The film received three Canadian Screen Award nominations, for Best Feature Length Documentary, Best Cinematography in a Documentary (Marie Davignon, Jessica Lee Gagné, Geneviève Perron) and Best Editing in a Documentary (Myriam Magassouba), at the 3rd Canadian Screen Awards in 2015.

References

External links
 

2013 films
2013 documentary films
Canadian documentary films
Quebec films
2010s French-language films
Women in Quebec
French-language Canadian films
2010s Canadian films
Documentary films about agriculture